The 1940 Volta a Catalunya was the 20th edition of the Volta a Catalunya cycle race and was held from 4 May to 12 May 1940. The race started and finished in Barcelona. The race was won by Christophe Didier.

Route and stages

General classification

References

1940
Volta
1940 in Spanish road cycling
May 1940 sports events